Several monarchs had titles used in diplomatic settings which were not part of their official national  royal style, but which signified their nationality.  The Treaty of Paris (1763) is an example of the use of these "treaty titles".

 August Majesty - Holy Roman Emperor
 Apostolic Majesty -  King of Hungary
 (Most) Catholic Majesty - King of Spain
 (Most) Christian Majesty - King of France
 (Most) Faithful Majesty - King of Portugal
 Orthodox Majesty - King of Poland
 Prussian Majesty - King of Prussia
 Sicilian Majesty - King of the Two Sicilies 
 Britannic Majesty - King of Great Britain, King of the United Kingdom

Noble titles
Treaty titles